The Greer's island skink or Solomon minute skink  (Geomyersia glabra) is a species of lizard in the family Scincidae. It is found in the Solomon Islands.

References

Geomyersia
Reptiles described in 1968
Taxa named by Allen Eddy Greer
Taxa named by Frederick Stanley Parker